Neufchâteau may refer to:

Places
 Neufchâteau, Luxembourg Province, a city and municipality in the province of Luxembourg, Wallonia, Belgium
 Arrondissement of Neufchâteau, Belgium
 Lake Neufchâteau, a little artificial lake
 Château Neufchâteau, on the List of castles and châteaux in Belgium
 Neufchâteau (B) railway station, a railway station on the L12 line Libramont-Luxembourg, see List of Belgian railway services
 Neufchâteau, Liège, a village in the province of Liège, Wallonia, Belgium
 Neufchâteau, Vosges, a municipality in the Vosges department, France
 Arrondissement of Neufchâteau, Vosges
 Canton of Neufchâteau, communes in eastern France and Grand Est
 , a railway station in Neufchâteau, Vosges
 , on the List of airports in France

People
 André of Neufchâteau (died c. 1400), a French Franciscan and scholastic philosopher
 François de Neufchâteau (1750–1828), French statesman, poet, and scientist

Other uses
 Battle of Neufchâteau, also known as the Battle of Rossignol, a World War I battle in August 1914
 Chateau Neuf, a building in Oslo
 Chateau-Neuf de Saint-Germain-en-Laye, a now mostly demolished castle in Saint-Germain-en-Laye, France

See also
 Châteauneuf (disambiguation)
 Neufchâtel (disambiguation)